The 2016 Mikhail Voronin Cup took place on December 19–20 in Moscow, Russia.

Competition format 
All participating gymnasts, including those who were not part of a team, participated in a qualification round, which also served as the team and all-around final. The results of this competition determined which individuals participated in the event finals, in which the eight highest scoring individuals on each apparatus competed.

Medal winners

References

2016
2016 in gymnastics
2016 in Russian sport
Sports competitions in Moscow
2016 in Moscow
December 2016 sports events in Russia